Searching for Paradise is a 2001 film, written and directed by Myra Paci. It was Paci's first feature film.

Searching for Paradise is the story of Gilda Mattei, a girl overcome with grief over the death of her father. In trying to cope with her depression and uncertainty about her purpose in life, she embarks on a journey in which she endeavors to meet her favorite actor, Michael DeSantis, for whom she has developed an obsession.

Cast 
Susan May Pratt as Gilda Mattei
Chris Noth as Michael DeSantis
Jeremy Davies as Adam
John Pierson as Jim Johnson
Michele Placido as Giorgio Mattei
Laila Robins as Barbara Mattei
Josef Sommer as Carl Greenslate
Mary Louise Wilson as Evelyn Greenslate
Samantha Buck as Andrea
Jonathan Lisecki as Dave Pierce

Awards and festivals
Susan May Pratt won the award for best actress at the Milan Film Festival, and Teodoro Maniaci received the Hamptons International Film Festival cinematography award for the film.

The film was the opening attraction at the 2002 Boston Film Festival. It was also shown at the Austin Film Festival to critical acclaim, and was screened at the Hawaii International Film Festival, the Philadelphia Film Festival, the Rhode Island International Film Festival, and the San Diego Film Festival.

References

External links 
 

2002 films
Films scored by Carter Burwell